The Chester County Library System (CCLS) in Chester County, Pennsylvania is a library system in southeastern Pennsylvania that was organized in 1965. It is a federated system composed of a District Center Library in Exton, Pennsylvania and seventeen member libraries. The system provides materials and information for life, work and pleasure.

History
The library system has its history starting in West Chester, Pennsylvania where it was once housed in a new county building on West Market Street and New Street, replacing the old Chester County Prison situated in the same location only 3 years earlier in 1959.

The county building was dedicated to honor Congressman Paul Dague in 1971.  In 1980, the Chester County Library moved to its current location in Exton (next to the Exton Square Mall). In 1982, the library in Exton received a National Association of Counties Award for its Library Literacy Program, the first in the U.S. state of Pennsylvania handling 30,000 illiterates and 15,000 non-English speaking residents.

Libraries

Atglen Public Library
Avon Grove Library
Chester Springs Library
Chester County Library and District Center
Coatesville Area Public Library
Downingtown Library
Easttown Library and Information Center
Henrietta Hankin Branch
In West Vincent Township
Honey Brook Community Library
Kennett Library
Malvern Public Library
Oxford Public Library
Paoli Library
Parkesburg Free Library
Phoenixville Public Library
Spring City Free Library
Tredyffrin Public Library
West Chester Public Library

References

External links
 Official website

County library systems in Pennsylvania
Public libraries in Pennsylvania
Education in Chester County, Pennsylvania